Glenwood is a city in, and the county seat of, Pope County, Minnesota, United States. The population was 2,657 at the 2020 census. It is located on the northeastern shore of Lake Minnewaska.

History
Glenwood was platted in 1866, and named for the glen and woods near the original town site. A post office called Glenwood has been in operation since 1867. The city was incorporated in 1912.

Geography

Glenwood is located at the east end of Lake Minnewaska at the junction of Minnesota State Highways 28, 29, 55, and 104. Lake Minnewaska is a large lake that brings in many people in the summer.

Demographics

2010 census
As of the census of 2010, there were 2,564 people, 1,185 households, and 656 families living in the city. The racial makeup of the city was 97.2% White, 0.8% African American, 0.3% Native American, 0.4% Asian, 0.1% from other races, and 1.3% from two or more races. Hispanic or Latino of any race were 1.3% of the population.

There were 1,185 households, of which 24.6% had children under the age of 18 living with them, 42.2% were married couples living together, 10.4% had a female householder with no husband present, 2.8% had a male householder with no wife present, and 44.6% were non-families. 40.4% of all households were made up of individuals, and 21.7% had someone living alone who was 65 years of age or older. The average household size was 2.08 and the average family size was 2.79.

The median age in the city was 44.1 years. 21.3% of residents were under the age of 18; 7.2% were between the ages of 18 and 24; 22.5% were from 25 to 44; 23.9% were from 45 to 64; and 25.2% were 65 years of age or older. The gender makeup of the city was 45.7% male and 54.3% female.

2000 census
As of the census of 2000, there were 2,594 people, 1,131 households, and 629 families living in the city.  The population density was 179.8/km2 (466.0/mi2).  There were 1,202 housing units at an average density of 83.3 inhabitants/km2 (215.9 inhabitants/mi2).  The racial makeup of the city was 98.92% White, 0.15% African American, 0.23% Native American, 0.00% Asian, 0.04% Pacific Islander, 0.31% from other races, and 0.35% from two or more races.  0.58% of the population were Hispanic or Latino of any race.

There were 1,131 households, out of which 24.7% had children under the age of 18 living with them, 44.2% were married couples living together, 9.1% had a woman whose husband does not live with her, and 44.3% were non-families. 40.0% of all households were made up of individuals, and 24.4% had someone living alone who was 65 years of age or older.  The average household size was 2.11 and the average family size was 2.83.

In the city, the population was spread out, with 20.9% under the age of 18, 7.6% from 18 to 24, 21.7% from 25 to 44, 18.8% from 45 to 64, and 31.0% who were 65 years of age or older.  The median age was 45 years.  For every 100 females, there were 81.5 males.  For every 100 females age 18 and over, there were 72.2 males.

The median income for a household in the city was $30,083, and the median income for a family was $41,486. Males had a median income of $30,000 versus $21,652 for females. The per capita income for the city was $21,758.  7.9% of the population and 3.6% of families were below the poverty line.  Out of the total people living in poverty, 8.6% were under the age of 18 and 11.8% were 65 or older.

Notable people

 John Englund, Wisconsin State Senator and newspaper editor
 Earl Hauge, Minnesota State Representative and Lutheran minister
 Loziene J. Lee, Minnesota state representative and labor activist
 Cindy Rarick, golfer; winner of five LPGA Tour events
 Ernest O. Wollan, physicist

References

External links
 Glenwood Chamber of Commerce
 Glenwood, Minnesota Official Website

Cities in Minnesota
Cities in Pope County, Minnesota
County seats in Minnesota